Elateropsis is a genus of beetles in the family Cerambycidae, containing the following species:

 Elateropsis antennata Galileo & Martins, 1994
 Elateropsis bahamica Galileo & Martins, 1994
 Elateropsis castanea (Zayas, 1975)
 Elateropsis caymanensis (Fisher, 1941)
 Elateropsis dichroma Lingafelter 2015
 Elateropsis ebenina Chevrolat, 1862
 Elateropsis fellerae (Chemsak, 1983)
 Elateropsis femorata (Sallé, 1855)
 Elateropsis foliacea Galileo & Martins, 1994
 Elateropsis fulvipes (Chevrolat in Guérin-Méneville, 1838)
 Elateropsis julio Lingafelter & Micheli, 2004
 Elateropsis lineata (Linnaeus, 1758)
 Elateropsis nigricornis (Fisher, 1941)
 Elateropsis nigripes (Fisher, 1941)
 Elateropsis peregrina Galileo & Martins, 1994
 Elateropsis quinquenotata Chevrolat, 1862
 Elateropsis reticulata Gahan, 1890
 Elateropsis rugosa Gahan, 1890
 Elateropsis scabrosa Gahan, 1890
 Elateropsis sericeiventris Chevrolat, 1862
 Elateropsis trimarginata (Cazier & Lacey, 1952)
 Elateropsis woodleyi Lingafelter 2015

References

Prioninae